The Kid from Brooklyn is a 1946 American musical comedy film directed by Norman Z. McLeod and starring Danny Kaye, Virginia Mayo, Vera-Ellen, Steve Cochran, Walter Abel, Eve Arden, and Fay Bainter. Virginia Mayo's and Vera-Ellen's singing voices were dubbed by Betty Russell and Dorothy Ellers, respectively.

Produced by Samuel Goldwyn, it is a remake of the Harold Lloyd film The Milky Way (1936) about a milkman who becomes world boxing champion. Lionel Stander plays the role of "Spider" Schultz in both versions of the movie.

Plot
Well-meaning and mild-mannered milkman Burleigh Sullivan (Kaye) meets Polly Pringle (Mayo), a beautiful, but out-of-work, singer, whilst on his rounds early in the morning. He tries to get her a job at the club where his sister Susie (Vera-Ellen) is performing, but gets the sack for his trouble. Whilst meeting Susie after the show, he sees her being molested by drunken boxer 'Speed' McFarlane and his bodyguard 'Spider'. In the fracas, Speed is knocked out and his manager, Gabby Sloan, is furious.

The newspapers pick up the story and photographers catch Burleigh 'knocking out' Speed again. In fact, as before, Speed is accidentally knocked out by Spider as a result of Sullivan's quick foot-work and propensity for ducking. Gabby decides to turn Burleigh into a fighter to turn the publicity to his advantage.

Burleigh goes on tour, but doesn't realize that all his fights have been fixed and his opponents have been asked to 'take a dive' to build up his image. He comes to think that he really is a great fighter, and develops a swollen head. Polly and Susie are not pleased with the turn of events. Meanwhile, Speed and Susie have become an item themselves.

Burleigh's contract is bought by Mr Austin, his former boss at Sunflower Milk, for $50,000, and he is set up to fight Speed for a charity fundraiser organised by socialite Mrs. E. Winthrop LeMoyne. Speed has accidentally been given an overdose of sleeping tablets and falls asleep during the fight, so Burleigh wins by default. Burleigh is reluctant to retire without having been KO'd, but Mrs. LeMoyne accidentally does just that. Now Burleigh can retire with a clear conscience. As promised by Mr Austin, he is given a partnership in the dairy company, with his former rival and new friend, Speed, as one of the district managers. But Gabby and Spider wind up working as milkmen.

Cast
 Danny Kaye as Burleigh Sullivan
 Virginia Mayo as Polly Pringle
 Vera-Ellen as Susie Sullivan
 Steve Cochran as Speed McFarlane
 Eve Arden as Ann
 Walter Abel as Gabby
 Lionel Stander as Spider
 Fay Bainter as Mrs. LeMoyne
 Clarence Kolb as Mr. Austin
 The Goldwyn Girls as Themselves

Reception
The film earned theatrical rentals of $3,960,000 in the United States and Canada and $1,530,000 overseas for a worldwide total of $5,490,000.

References

External links

1946 films
1946 musical comedy films
American musical comedy films
Remakes of American films
American sports comedy films
American boxing films
Films directed by Norman Z. McLeod
Films scored by Carmen Dragon
Films set in New York City
RKO Pictures films
Samuel Goldwyn Productions films
1940s sports comedy films
1940s English-language films
1940s American films